Ranch dressing is an American salad dressing usually made from buttermilk, salt, garlic, onion, mustard, herbs (commonly chives, parsley and dill), and spices (commonly pepper, paprika and ground mustard seed) mixed into a sauce based on mayonnaise or another oil emulsion. Sour cream and yogurt are sometimes used in addition to, or as a substitute for, buttermilk and mayonnaise.

Ranch has been the best-selling salad dressing in the United States since 1992, when it overtook Italian. It is also popular in the United States and Canada as a dip, and as a flavoring for potato chips and other foods. In 2017, 40% of Americans named ranch as their favorite dressing, according to a study by the Association for Dressings and Sauces.

History
In 1949, Thayer, Nebraska, native Steve Henson (1918–2007) moved with his wife to the Anchorage, Alaska, area, where he worked for three years in the remote Alaskan bush as a plumbing contractor. Endeavoring to keep his work crews happy, he invented a new salad dressing. Henson's success in the plumbing business enabled him to retire at age 35, and he moved with his wife to Santa Barbara County, California. After a year and half, the restless Henson, searching for some livelihood to occupy his time, purchased the Sweetwater Ranch in San Marcos Pass in 1956 and renamed it Hidden Valley Ranch. In creating the menu for the ranch kitchen, Henson served the salad dressing he had created in Alaska, which the guests enjoyed. Its popularity led Henson to mix a batch for his friend, Audrey Ovington, owner of Cold Spring Tavern, which became the first commercial customer for the dressing. By 1957, a packaged mix to make the dressing at home was being offered in stores.

Henson began selling the packages by mail for 75 cents apiece, and eventually devoted every room in his home to the operation. By the mid-1960s, the guest ranch itself had closed, but Henson's "ranch dressing" mail order business was thriving. By the early 1970s, Henson realized that the operation was too big to keep running it at the ranch, which remained its corporate headquarters. The Hensons incorporated Hidden Valley Ranch Food Products, Inc., and opened a factory to manufacture ranch dressing in larger volumes, which they first distributed to supermarkets in the Southwest, and eventually, nationwide. The manufacturing of the mix was moved to Griffith Laboratories in San Jose, and the packaging was done in Los Angeles. The operation later moved to Colorado, and then in 1972 moved again to Sparks, Nevada. In October 1972, the Hidden Valley Ranch brand was bought by Clorox for $8 million and Henson went into retirement again.

Kraft Foods and General Foods responded by introducing similar dry seasoning packets labeled as "ranch style".  As a result, they were both sued for trademark infringement by the Waples-Platter Companies, the Texas-based manufacturer of Ranch Style Beans (now part of Conagra Brands), even though Waples-Platter had declined to enter the salad dressing market itself over concerns that the tendency of such products to spoil rapidly would damage its brand. The case was tried before federal judge Eldon Brooks Mahon in Fort Worth, Texas, in 1976. Judge Mahon ruled in favor of Waples-Platter in a lengthy opinion which described the various "ranch style" and "ranch" products then available, of which many had been created to compete against Hidden Valley Ranch. Judge Mahon specifically noted that Hidden Valley Ranch and Waples-Platter had no dispute with each other (though he also noted that Hidden Valley Ranch was simultaneously suing General Foods in a separate federal case in California). The only issue before the Texas federal district court was that Waples-Platter was disputing the right of other American food manufacturers to compete against Hidden Valley Ranch by using the label "ranch style".

Meanwhile, Clorox reformulated the Hidden Valley Ranch dressing several times to make it more convenient for consumers. The first change was to include buttermilk flavoring in the seasoning, meaning much less expensive regular milk could be used to mix the dressing instead. In 1983, Clorox developed a more popular non-refrigerated bottled formulation.

During the 1980s, ranch became a common snack food flavor, starting with Cool Ranch Doritos in 1987, and Hidden Valley Ranch Wavy Lay's in 1994.

During the 1990s, Hidden Valley had three child-oriented variations of ranch dressing: pizza, nacho cheese, and taco flavors.

As of 2002, Clorox subsidiary Hidden Valley Manufacturing Company was producing ranch packets and bottled dressings at two large factories, in Reno, Nevada, and Wheeling, Illinois.

Popularity and variants
Ranch dressing is produced by many manufacturers, including Hidden Valley, Kroger, Ken's, Kraft, Litehouse, Marie's, Newman's Own, and Wish-Bone.

In the Southwestern United States, there is a variant from New Mexican cuisine called "green chile ranch" which adds green New Mexico chile pepper as an ingredient. Restaurant chains like Dion's produce and sell green chile ranch, as do others in the region.

See also

 List of dips

References

External links

Hidden Valley Ranch Dressing history

American inventions
Dips (food)
Salad dressings
Food and drink introduced in the 1950s
Mayonnaise
Food and drink in California
American condiments